"Who Do You Love, I Hope?" is a popular song by Irving Berlin. It was published in 1946 and introduced in the musical Annie Get Your Gun when it was sung on opening night by Kenny Bowers & Betty Anne Nyman. In the 1946 cast recording, the song was sung by Robert Lenn & Kathleen Carnes.

The song is a duet between two of the lead characters in the musical, Tommy Keeler and Winnie Tate.

The song was used in the Annie Get Your Gun album in 1963 when it was sung by Kelly Brown & Renée Winters.

References

Songs from Annie Get Your Gun
Songs written by Irving Berlin
1946 songs
Male–female vocal duets